Beverwijk railway station is located in Beverwijk, the Netherlands. The station opened on 1 May 1867 and is on the Haarlem–Uitgeest railway.

Train services
As of 12 December 2021, the following services call at Beverwijk:

National rail

Bus services

References

External links
NS website 
Dutch public transport travel planner 

Railway stations in North Holland
Railway stations opened in 1867
Beverwijk